Eek-A-Mouse (born Ripton Joseph Hylton, 19 November 1957) is a Jamaican reggae musician. He is one of the earliest artists to be described as a "singjay". Eek-A-Mouse is well known for pioneering his own style of scatting, differing from the-then toasting deejays in the 80s.

Biography
Born in Kingston, Jamaica, Eek-A-Mouse began his music career when he was in college, releasing two roots reggae singles under his own name, which were produced by his mathematics tutor, Mr. Dehaney. These early works were influenced by the music of Pablo Moses. He then went on to work for various  sound systems over the next few years and also released a few more singles. He adopted the stage name "Eek-A-Mouse" in 1979, taking the name of a racehorse he always bet on; it was a nickname his friends had used for some time. He began recording for Joe Gibbs in 1979, having a hit straight away with "Once a Virgin", now showing the influence of Ranking Joe, and this was soon followed with "Wa-Do-Dem" (produced by Douglas Boothe), and "Modelling Queen", which began an association with Linval Thompson, who produced his debut Bubble Up Yu Hip album.

By the end of 1980, he had linked up with producer Henry "Junjo" Lawes, with whom he had big hits in 1981 with the likes of "Virgin Girl" and a recut "Wa-Do-Dem". In 1981, he was the star of the Reggae Sunsplash Festival, cheering audiences still mourning over the death of reggae icon Bob Marley. His association with Lawes led to a string of successful singles and albums, and in 1982 his hits included "Wild Like a Tiger", "For Hire and Removal", "Do You Remember", and "Ganja Smuggling". The same year he released his second album, Wa Do Dem. The "Operation Eradication" single showed Hylton's serious side, the song inspired by the vigilante killing of close friend and fellow DJ Errol Shorter. Skidip was released before the year was out.

Further albums followed with 1983 Mouse and the Man, produced by Linval Thompson, and 1984 Mouseketeer, again produced by Lawes. He also featured on several of the live dancehall albums from the era, including the Aces International and Live at Skateland collections. In the second half of the decade his popularity began to wane slightly, and he targeted the United States with the Assassinator album in 1985 (his first US release), produced by Anthony and Ronald Welch. He also travelled to the United Kingdom to record The King and I the same year, the album targeted at the rock crossover audience to which he had begun to appeal.

His 1988 album Eek-A-Nomics saw him begin to establish himself with an international audience, spawning a club hit with "The Freak", and he was signed by Island Records in 1989. He returned to prominence with 1991's U-Neek album, which continued the rock-oriented style, including a cover version of Led Zeppelin's "D'yer Mak'er", and from which the hit single "You're The One I Need" was taken. He went through a period of relative quietness before returning in 1996 with the Black Cowboy album.

He also has a performance in the 1991 gangster movie New Jack City playing a drug-dealing Rastafarian named Fat Smitty. That same year, he also had a performance in Out for Justice playing a chauffeur of a pimp.

Eek-A-Mouse is a regular at Sunsplash and often teams up with reggae duo Michigan & Smiley. An album was issued of his performance in 1983. 

He performed in Jamaica for the first time in eight years in August 2015 at the Marcus Garvey Festival in Ocho Rios.

Collaborations 
He was also featured on nu metal group P.O.D.'s album Satellite, lending his vocals to the rock-reggae track "Ridiculous." He can also be heard on OPM's album, ForThemAsses, on the track "Perfect Day." Eek-A-Mouse recorded a song with hip-hop recording artist Ditch, called "Smoke it up" (2007, released in 2009), which is featured on Ditch's  CD Public Intoxication. The song by Ditch and Eek-a-Mouse is featured on the Jack Herer documentary as well. Has as well teamed up with Bounty Killer and Damian Marley in "Khaki Suit".

Legal issues

On 16 August 2008, Eek-a-Mouse was arrested on charges of rape and narcotic possession. He fled the United States and an arrest warrant with a million dollar bond was issued. These charges were filed in Dare County, North Carolina after a performance at the Port O' Call restaurant. He failed to appear at the first hearing and was given a failure to appear charge and his bond was set at $1,375,000.

On 21 November 2012, Eek-a-Mouse was found in Paraguay without a proper visa and was extradited to the US. He was initially charged with felony rape, felony kidnapping, felony cocaine charges and misdemeanor relating to possession of marijuana. In July 2013 he was released after a plea agreement, having pleaded "no contest" to misdemeanor charges for assault on a female and attempted crime against nature, with his time already spent in jail covering his sentence.

Discography 
thumb|200 px|Eek-A-Mouse with band performing in 2006
Bubble Up Yu Hip (1980), Greensleeves
Wa-Do-Dem (1981), Shanachie
Skidip! (1982), Shanachie
The Mouse and the Man (1983), Shanachie
Assassinator (1983), RAS
Live At Reggae Sunsplash (1983), Sunsplash (with Michigan & Smiley)
Mouseketeer (1984), Greensleeves
The King and I (1985), Original Sounds/(1986), RAS
Eek-A-Nomics (1988), RAS
U-Neek (1991), Mango
Black Cowboy (1996), Explicit
Eeeksperience (2001), Coach House
Mouse Gone Wild (2004), Sanctuary
Eek-A-Speeka (2004), Greensleeves
Live in San Francisco (2006), 2B1
Eekziled (2011)
Give it to them (2016), road block 
Put Food On The Ghetto Youth Table (2022), Irie Ites

Compilations
Mouse-A-Mania (1987), RAS
The Very Best Of (1987), Greensleeves
Ras Portraits (1997), RAS
At His Best (1998)
The Very Best Of Vol.2 (2003), Shanachie
Most Wanted (2009), Greensleeves
Ganja Smuggling (2009)
Reggae Anthology: Eek-Ology (2013), VP

See also
Hyman Wright

Notes

References

External links

1957 births
Living people
Jamaican reggae musicians
Musicians from Kingston, Jamaica
Greensleeves Records artists